Appleton is an unincorporated community and census-designated place (CDP) in Griffin Township, Pope County, Arkansas, United States. It was first listed as a CDP in the 2020 census with a population of 399.

The town contained a post office from 1879 until 1968. It was named for an apple orchard that surrounded an early drug store.

Demographics

2020 census

Note: the US Census treats Hispanic/Latino as an ethnic category. This table excludes Latinos from the racial categories and assigns them to a separate category. Hispanics/Latinos can be of any race.

References

Census-designated places in Pope County, Arkansas
Census-designated places in Arkansas
Unincorporated communities in Pope County, Arkansas
Unincorporated communities in Arkansas
Populated places established in 1879